Sippo is an unincorporated community in Stark County, in the U.S. state of Ohio.

History
A post office called Sippo was established in 1882, and remained in operation until 1905. The community takes its name from nearby Sippo Creek.

References

Unincorporated communities in Stark County, Ohio
Unincorporated communities in Ohio